Seattle City Light is the public utility providing electricity to Seattle, Washington, in the United States, and parts of its metropolitan area, including all of Shoreline and Lake Forest Park and parts of unincorporated King County, Burien, Normandy Park, SeaTac, Renton, and Tukwila. Seattle City Light is the 10th largest public utility in the United States and the first municipal utility in the US to own and operate a hydroelectric facility. In 2005, it became the first electric utility in the United States to fully offset all its carbon emissions and has remained carbon neutral every year since.

Seattle City Light is a department of the City of Seattle and is governed by the Economic Development, Technology & City Light committee of the Seattle City Council.

Overview
The approximately 906,595 residents (461,496 metered customers) served by Seattle City Light use about 9,074,062 megawatt-hours annually. Seattle City Light was the first electric utility in the nation to become greenhouse gas neutral (2005) and has the longest-running energy conservation program in the country. The utility owns a large portion of its generation, which is predominately hydro, so is able to offer some of the country's lowest rates to its customers (of utilities in urban areas). Seattle City Light's customer breakdown shows 381,419 residential customers who consumed 2,914,563 megawatt-hours of electricity in 2015 and 41,391 non-residential customers that consumed 6,242,931 megawatt-hours.

History

Public responsibility for electrical energy in Seattle dates to 1890 with creation of the Department of Lighting and Water Works. In 1902, Seattle voters passed a bond issue to develop hydroelectric power on the Cedar River under the administration of the Water Department. Electricity from this development began to serve Seattle in 1905. A City Charter amendment in 1910 created the Lighting Department. Under the leadership of Superintendent James D. Ross, the department developed the Skagit River Hydroelectric Project, which began supplying power in 1924. As superintendent, Ross instituted programs to make Seattle City Light a national model for municipal ownership, such as encouraging the use of electricity for home heating, cooking, and other appliances, and directly selling appliances to customers. He staffed each branch office with an appliance salesman, and arranged for home economists to give lessons on new labor-saving devices. City Light's program of offering free appliance repair, which began in 1910, was ended by a disastrous drought in 1977 that impacted hydropower capacity.

Both public and private power were supplied to Seattle until 1951 when the City purchased the private electrical power supply operations, making the Lighting Department the sole supplier. The Boundary Project in northern Washington began operation in 1967 and currently supplies over half of City Light's power generation. Approximately ten percent of City Light's income comes from the sale of surplus energy to customers in the Northwest and Southwest. The current name of the agency was adopted in 1978 when the Department was reorganized.

In 1957, City Light was one of 17 utilities to join the Washington Public Power Supply System (later named Energy Northwest), a municipal corporation, to combine resources and build facilities.

In 2014, City Light completed the installation of 41,000 LED street lights along residential streets. Installation of LED streetlights on arterial streets started in 2015 and is expected to be complete by the end of 2018.

The utility's former CEO, Jorge Carrasco, entered a dispute with brand.com over search result "scrubbing" in 2014.

Electric vehicle prototypes

In the 1960s and 1970s, Seattle City Light's research and development department developed several prototype electric vehicles. The "Electruc," from 1968, was an experimental utility truck. In 1973 the department converted an AMC Gremlin to run on electric power. The RT1, developed in 1976, was a city car intended for use in downtown Seattle in a zone where most internal combustion engine-powered vehicles would be banned. It never entered production.

Seattle's electricity supply
The 2016 official fuel mix statistics by the state of Washington for Seattle City Light show approximately 88% hydroelectric, 5% nuclear, 4% wind, 1% coal, 1% natural gas, 1% biogas. City Light's portfolio of energy sources includes electricity purchased through long-term contracts with the Bonneville Power Administration (BPA). The remaining power comes from a mixture of sources.

Owned facilities

The utility owns and operates a total of seven hydro facilities: 
 The Skagit River Hydroelectric Project, a series of three hydroelectric dams (Gorge, Diablo, and Ross) on the Skagit River in northern Washington State.  The project supplies approximately 25 percent of Seattle's electric power.
 The Boundary Dam on the Pend Oreille River in northeastern Washington State
 Cedar Falls Dam, about 35 miles southeast of Seattle
 South Fork of the Tolt
 Newhalem
Seattle City Light residential customers currently pay about 10–14 cents per kilowatt-hour of electricity. Seattle has the lowest residential and commercial electrical rates among comparably-sized cities in the United States.

Conservation efforts 
Seattle's Energy 1990 plan bound City Light to meet load growth through conservation efforts as well as increased power generation. City Light encouraged customers to wrap water heaters, insulate attics, adjust thermostats, and weatherize windows and doors. Over 20 years, conservation efforts reduced use by 6.5 million megawatt-hours and customers' bills by $215 million.

City Light implemented programs in the 1990s to mitigate the impact of the Skagit dams on salmon runs. Modifying water regulation to ensure that salmon nests remained under water resulted in a loss equivalent to more than $45 million in potential power over 30 years, yet dramatically increased the number of salmon returning to the Skagit River. Conservation efforts expanded in 2000, with increased emphasis on protecting salmon and other species and to develop renewable energy sources.

City Light became the first utility in the United States to reach net-zero greenhouse gas emissions in 2005.

Lawsuits and labor disputes 

During the late 1960's, City Light instituted affirmative action programs designed to integrate men of color, mostly Black men, into the electrical trades field. These programs failed and resulted in a series of racial discrimination lawsuits against the utility. 

In 1972 Gordon Vickery, the former chief of the Seattle Fire Department, was appointed as the superintendent of City Light by Seattle mayor Wes Uhlman. At the time, Vickery had been exploring the possibility of running for mayor, and his appointment was a calculated political move by Uhlman in an attempt to forge an alliance with him and prevent a future electoral challenge. In his role as superintendent, Vickery was tasked with reducing City Light's budget through wage cuts and work speed-ups, which proved deeply unpopular with employees. In addition, Vickery hoped craft a successful affirmative action program for women to use as experience that would position himself as a progressive in future electoral ventures.

In 1973, policy changes instituted by Vickery, seen by many as draconian, prompted electricians and office workers to stage a work stoppage for 11 days in April 1974 in protest. In 1975, a 98 day strike by electricians represented by the IBEW local 77 became the longest public employee strike in the history of the state. During the strike, supervisors and managers stepped in and were able to keep the system functional, although routine maintenance and new connections stopped. As City Light was unable to be shut down and local 77 failed to gain support of the broader union, and the electricians were forced to settle for a contract with worse working conditions.

In 1973 City Light hired Clara Fraser, a socialist feminist activist, as a training and education coordinator tasked with redesigning an affirmative action program to integrate women into the electrical trades. Fraser created an all-female electrical trades trainee (ETT) program in which the women were to be given two weeks of physical and classroom instruction and allowed membership, as well as their own bargaining unit, in the IBEW local 77 as soon as they began. Fraser used her connections to the feminist community to recruit women for the program, resulting in over 300 applications for 10 positions. The training was cancelled, however, only a week after it began, and the trainees were told to report for field work the next week. Fraser was laid off in July 1975. The ETT program was officially terminated in September 1975, and eight of the ten female trainees were laid off. These actions by Vickery and City Light management were widely seen as retaliation against Fraser for her participation in the 1974 walkout. 

After the cancellation of training, nine of the female ETT's filed a discrimination complaint with the City of Seattle Office of Women's Rights, stating they were being denied the same amount of training and pay given to male employees, and their terminations were later added. In July 1976, City Light was ordered by a court to reinstate six of the eight terminated women, pay them damage fees, and make them eligible for apprenticeship programs.

Following her termination, Fraser filed a lawsuit against Seattle City Light, alleging discrimination on the basis of sex and political ideology. After a seven year legal battle, a court ruled in favor of Fraser, ordering her reinstatement and payment in damages.

In 1983, the Employee Committee for Equal Rights at City Light (CERCL) was established by a group of women employees and employees of color to fight discrimination and harassment in the workplace. CERCL membership grew rapidly over the course of the 1980's and pressured the Seattle Human Rights Department to investigate discrimination cases that had previously been met with inaction.

Art program

Seattle City Light began commissioning decorative designs for its manhole covers in the 1970s after suggestions from Jacquetta Blanchett Freeman, a member of the Seattle Arts Commission. A set of 19 manhole covers with relief maps of Downtown Seattle were designed by city employee Anne Knight and installed beginning in April 1977 to aid with wayfinding. Knight's covers use raised symbols to represent local landmarks, including the now-demolished Kingdome, that are labeled with a key on the outer ring other manhole. Other commissioned designs include portraits of city figures, a Tlingit-styled whale, and Nothwestern flowers. , there are 115 manhole covers in Seattle with decorative designs.

In 2012, the Seattle City Light Conservation Program hired Adam Frank to produce a large scale installation that featured the City of Seattle's hydroelectric power sources. This work of light was a projected living map of Seattle's hydroelectric generation and electricity use.

Notes

Further reading

Archives 

 Megan Cornish Papers, 1970-2003. 10.26 cubic feet. At the Labor Archives of Washington, University of Washington Libraries Special Collections.

 Clara Fraser Papers, 1905-1998, 36.70 cubic feet. At the Labor Archives of Washington, University of Washington Libraries Special Collections.
 Heidi Durham Papers and Oral History Interviews, 1937-2017, 1.57 cubic feet. At the Labor Archives of Washington, University of Washington Libraries Special Collections.

Articles and interviews 

 Megan Cornish, Seattle Civil Rights and Labor History Project, 2005.
 Megan Cornish Interview with Nicole Grant and Alex Morrow, October 20, 2005, YouTube, uploaded by Seattle Civil Rights and Labor History Project, September 9, 2016, Megan Cornish - YouTube
 Megan Cornish, Conor Casey, and Ellie Belew Interview with Mike Dumovich, "We Do the Work," KSVR, February 22, 2019.
 Nicole Grant, Challenging Sexism at City Light: The Electrical Trades Trainee Program, Seattle Civil Rights and Labor History Project, 2006.
 Ellie Belew Interview with Mimi Rosenberg, YouTube, uploaded by Radical Women - U.S., uploaded March 28. 2019, HIGH VOLTAGE WOMEN: Interview & slideshow

Books 

 Ellie Belew, High Voltage Women: Breaking Barriers at Seattle City Light, Red Letter Press, 2019.

External links 

Seattle City Light website
Guide to the Seattle City Light Department History Files 1894-1972
Guide to the Seattle City Light Annual Reports 1910-2000

Seattle City Light
Companies based in Seattle
Municipal electric utilities of the United States
Government of Seattle
Seattle metropolitan area
Public utilities of the United States
Public utilities established in 1905
1905 establishments in Washington (state)